Pigalle is a 1994 French neo-noir film written and directed by Karim Dridi and starring Véra Briole and Francis Renaud.

The film was entered into the main competition at the 51st edition of the Venice Film Festival. It was also nominated at the 1996 César Awards for Best First Feature Film.

Plot
The film is set in the Pigalle district of Paris, which is known for its dark and depraved underworld, with strip joints, peep shows, sex shops, drug dens and prostitution. Within this seedy district, rival drug dealers compete against each other, using others (like pawns) in dangerous battles. 
In one of these battles, is 'Divine' (Blanca Li), a transsexual and transvestite who performs in a nightclub. Her lover is 'Fifi' (Francis Renaud), who is a pickpocket and street hustler. He also flirts with 'Vera' (Véra Briole), who works as a striptease dancer and attraction at a peep show. She lives with 'Jesus le Gitan' (Patrick Chauvel), a career counselor and a small-time drug dealer. Divine is bullied to death, by a dwarf and large thug into giving some important information to one drug dealer 'Malfait' (Philippe Ambrosini). Jesus is then found next dead, decapitated in Vera's bed. Another rival drug dealer forces Véra to coerce Fifi into becoming a hitman.

Cast 

 Véra Briole as Véra 
 Francis Renaud as Fifi 
 Raymond Gil as Fernande
 Bobby Pacha as Le Pacha
 Blanca Li as Divine
 Philippe Ambrosini as Le Malfait
 Younesse Boudache as Mustaf
 Jean-Michel Fête as P'tit Fred
 Christian Saunier as Cri-Cri
 Christian Auger as René
 Olindo Cavadini as Polo 
 Roger Desprez as Roger l'Elégant
 Patrick Chauvel as Le Gitan
 Jean-Claude Grenier as l'Empereur
 Jean-Jacques Jauffret as Marc-Antoine
 Jacky Baps as Forceps
 Philippe Nahon as Lezzi

Reception
David Rooney of Variety (magazine) stated in 1994, that the film is "bruising but unexpectedly redemptive tract perhaps piles on one or two tragedies too many".

References

External links

French drama films
1994 drama films
1994 films
French neo-noir films
Films directed by Karim Dridi
1990s French films